This is a list of notable alumni and faculty of the University of California, Riverside.

Notable alumni

Nobel laureates
 Richard R. Schrock – Chemistry, 2005, professor at University of California, Riverside

Academia, science, and technology
 Peter Adriaens – professor of engineering and entrepreneurship at the [selling Biology textbook
 Mason Gaffney – professor of economics and prominent Georgist
 Harmohinder Singh Gill – plant pathologist who pioneered fungus classification by disc electrophoresis
 Lynn G. Gref – technologist and systems engineer
 Matthew Haughey – blogger and founder of MetaFilter
 Marigold Linton – director of American Indian outreach at the University of Kansas
 Gary North – economist and author
 Arthur Riggs – director of the Beckman Research Institute and former geneticist with Genentech and father of modern biotechnology
 Pedram Salimpour – physician-scientist, author, and professor
 Bettie Steinberg – microbiologist, Chief Scientific Officer for The Feinstein Institute for Medical Research
 Peter Steinberger – Dean of the Faculty at Reed College, Robert H. and Blanche Day Ellis Professor of Political Science and Humanities
 Tim White – professor of integrative biology and research, paleoanthropologist
 Jennifer Wilby – director of the Centre for Systems Studies, University of Hull
 Charles E. Young – first UCR student body president and former chancellor at the University of California, Los Angeles

Arts, film, and literature
 Earl W. Bascom – inventor, actor, rodeo cowboy, Hall of Fame inductee, international artist and sculptor
 Amine Bouhafa – Tunisian composer and engineer, winner of the 2015 César Award for Best Music for the movie Timbuktu
 Steve Breen – 1998 Pulitzer Prize-winning editorial cartoonist
 Jamie Chung – actress, TV series The Real World: San Diego and films, such as I Now Pronounce You Chuck and Larry, Sorority Row, Grown Ups, The Hangover II
 Billy Collins – eleventh US Poet Laureate
 Katherine Fugate – screenwriter Valentine's Day and creator of Army Wives TV series
 Elizabeth George – mystery writer
 Barbara Hambly – novelist and screenwriter
 Howard Hendrix – novelist
 Ryan Holiday – author of Trust Me, I'm Lying: Confessions of a Media Manipulator; director of marketing for American Apparel
 Lisa Kekaula – lead singer for The Bellrays
 Patricia Ja Lee – actress known for role as Cassie Chan as the Pink Ranger in the television series Power Rangers: Turbo and Power Rangers in Space
 Nakul Dev Mahajan – choreographer
 Daryl F. Mallett – author, editor, publisher
 Steve Nguyen – film director, producer
 Ruben Quesada – poet
 Lindsay Ridgeway – actress, Boy Meets World
 Charlyne Yi – actress, comedian, and performance artist (Knocked Up)
 Philip Michael Thomas – actor, Miami Vice

Athletics
 Matt Andriese – Major League pitcher for the Seattle Mariners
 Michael Basinger – former professional football player for the Green Bay Packers
 Jennifer Bermingham – golfer
 Pat Hill – head football coach of Fresno State
 Butch Johnson – former professional football player for the Dallas Cowboys and the Denver Broncos
 Joe Kelly – Major League pitcher for the Los Angeles Dodgers
 Aaron Long – professional MLS soccer player for the New York Red Bulls
 John Lowenstein – former Major League Baseball player
 Steve Lubratich – former Major League Baseball player and current Cleveland Indians Special Assistant to the GM
 AnnMaria De Mars – 1984 Judo World Champion, mother of Ronda Rousey
 Brenda Martinez – track and field athlete
 Gary McCord – professional golfer, CBS announcer and analyst and won the DII individual golf championship in 1970
 Troy Percival – all-time saves leader for the Los Angeles Angels of Anaheim
 Dan Runzler – Major League pitcher for the Boston Red Sox
 Marc Rzepczynski – Major League pitcher for the Arizona Diamondbacks
 Michael Salazar – professional MLS soccer player 
 Eric Show – former professional baseball player for the San Diego Padres and Oakland Athletics
 Chris Smith – Major League pitcher for the Oakland Athletics
 Erasmo Solorzano – professional MLS soccer player for the Chivas USA acquired in the 2007 draft
 Brendan Steele – professional golfer on the PGA Tour

Business, politics, and law
 David S. Cunningham, Jr. – Los Angeles City Council member, 1973–87
 Eduardo Garcia – current California State Assemblyman for the 56th District
 Gloria Romero – former State Senate Majority Whip, former California Assembly member, 49th District
 Holly J. Mitchell – current California State Senator for the 30th and 26th (2013–2014) District, former California State Assemblymember to the 54th and 47th (2010–2012) Districts
 Jose Medina – current California State Assemblyman for the 61st District
 Julie Furuta-Toy – current U.S. Ambassador to Equatorial Guinea
 Ken Mettler – past President of the California Republican Assembly
 Lloyd Levine – former California State Assemblyman for the 40th District
 Marc Steinorth – current California State Assemblyman for the 40th District
 Mark Takano – current U.S. House of Representative for the 41st District
 Michael Huerta – former Administrator of the Federal Aviation Administration
Paul Cook – former U.S. Member of Congress for the CA-08 district, current Supervisor for San Bernardino County
 Rod Pacheco – former Riverside County District Attorney, California Assembly member
 Ronald Neumann – former U.S. Ambassador to Algeria
 Ruben Barrales – deputy assistant to President Bush and director of the Office of Intergovernmental Affairs in the White House, former San Mateo County supervisor
 Sabrina Cervantes – current California State Assemblywoman for the 60th District
 Stefanie Schaeffer – defense attorney, 2006 winner of Donald Trump's reality show, The Apprentice

Other
 Jeff Cooper – creator of the modern technique of shooting; firearms expert who defined the modern scout rifle
 James Holmes – gunman in the 2012 Aurora, Colorado shooting; currently serving a life sentence for murder
 Shruti Kapoor – economist, women's right's activist, and social entrepreneur
 Anil Raj – humanitarian activist killed in 2019 in a terrorist attack in Kabul while working for U.N.

Notable faculty
 Chris Abani – professor of creative writing and recipient of the Pen Center Freedom to Write Award, Prince Claus Award, a Lannan Literary Fellowship, a Hurston-Wright Legacy Award, and the Hemingway Foundation/PEN Award
 Reza Aslan – Professor of Creative Writing, writer, producer, critic, religion scholar, television celebrity James Joyce Award
 John Baez – professor of mathematics, mathematical physicist
 Alexander A. Balandin – professor of electrical engineering
 Lindon W. Barrett – professor and cultural theorist
 Bir Bhanu – Distinguished Professor of Electrical Engineering, director of the Center for Research in Intelligent Systems
 Alfred M. Boyce – first dean of the College of Agriculture
 Patricia Cardoso – Award-winning filmmaker, Professor of Film
 Christopher Chase-Dunn – sociologist, contributor to world-systems theory
 Sean Cutler – plant scientist noted for discovery of pyrabactin
 Mike Davis – Emeritus Professor, urban theorist and author MacArthur Fellow in 1998. He won the Lannan Literary Award for Nonfiction 
 James H. Dieterich – Distinguished Professor of Geophysics, member of the National Academy of Sciences
 Josh Emmons – American novelist
 Steve Erickson – Distinguished Professor of Creative Writing, American author, essayist, critic Lannan Literary Award Guggenheim
 John Martin Fischer – professor of philosophy, Vice-President of the Pacific Division of the American Philosophical Association, primary proponent of semi-compatibilism
 Katie Ford – American Poet
 Theodore Garland, Jr. – a founder of the field of evolutionary physiology
 Gail Hanson – Distinguished Professor of Physics
 Allison Adelle Hedge Coke – Distinguished Professor of Creative Writing, poet, writer, editor, China's First Jade Nurtured SiHui Female International Poetry Award, a Witter Bynner Fellowship, a Fulbright Scholar, American Book Award, 
 Juan Felipe Herrera –  Emeritus Professor, poet, Tomás Rivera Endowed Chair, National Book Critics Circle Award, Guggenheim Fellowship, PEN USA Poetry Award, American Book Award, California State Poet Laureate, United States Poet Laureate
 Ivan Hinderaker – former chancellor
 Nalo Hopkinson – Professor of Creative Writing, science fiction and fantasy writer Andre Norton Award and British Fantasy Award
 Theodore L. Hullar – former chancellor
 Laila Lalami – professor, Pulitzer Prize finalist
 Perry Link – Chancellorial Chair, professor of China Studies
 Ronald O. Loveridge – Mayor of Riverside, California
 Tom Lutz – Distinguished Professor of Creative Writing, author, literary critic, founder and editor of the Los Angeles Review of Books
 Robert Nisbet – conservative sociologist and early Dean of Letters and Science at UCR
 John W. Olmsted – first chairman of the Humanities division
Raymond L. Orbach – former chancellor and first Under Secretary of Energy for Science
 Michelle H. Raheja – Associate Professor of English, autobiography, visual culture, and film critic, Director of California Center for Native Nations, Fulbright Scholar awarded the first annual Emory Elliott Book Award
 Robert Rosenthal – professor of psychology, former chair of Harvard's psychology department 
 Irwin Sherman – professor of biology, specializing in malariology
 George Edgar Slusser – professor of comparative literature, science fiction expert
 Andrea Smith – Associate Professor in the Department of Media and Cultural Studies, Nobel Peace Prize nominee
 Jane Smiley – Distinguished Professor of Creative Writing, writer, Pulitzer Prize winning author
 Harry Scott Smith – entomologist
 Susan Straight – Distinguished Professor of Creative Writing, writer, National Book Award finalist Lannan Literary Award 
 Karl Taube – professor of anthropology, specializing in research into pre-Columbian Mesoamerican cultures
 Bob Toledo – former UCR football coach, 13th head coach of UCLA
 John V. Tunney – professor of business law, former United States Senator and member of Congress
 Jonathan H. Turner – sociologist, one of the last remaining grand theorists in the discipline, author of Structure of Sociological Theory and Emergence of Sociological Theory
 Seymour Van Gundy – former dean of the College of Natural and Agricultural Sciences
 Georgia Warnke – Distinguished Professor of Philosophy and the director of the Center for Ideas and Society

People
 
Riverside people